Domasław may refer to the following places in Poland:
Domasław in Gmina Kobierzyce, Wrocław County in Lower Silesian Voivodeship (SW Poland)
Other places called Domasław (listed in Polish Wikipedia)